The Naval Secretary is the Royal Navy officer who advises the First Sea Lord and Chief of Naval Staff on naval officer appointing (and General Officers).

Their counterpart in the British Army is the Military Secretary. The Royal Air Force equivalent is the Air Secretary. The Director People and Training has taken over the role, combining the responsibilities of Flag Officer Sea Training.

History
The Office of the Naval Secretary was originally established in 1800 when the appointment was styled  Private Secretary to the First Lord of the Admiralty and remained so styled until 1911. In 1912 it was re-titled  Naval Secretary to the First Lord of the Admiralty.

When the Admiralty department was abolished in 1964 the post was renamed Naval Secretary, colloquially known as "NAVSEC", and now advising the Royal Navy's military head and, consequently, the Navy Board on future appointments. In the case of tri-service appointments, the responsibility was to recommend candidates to the Defence Board.

From 2010 to 2015, Sir David Steel, as Naval Secretary, simultaneously held the additional title of  Chief Naval Logistics Officer (as head the Naval Logistics Branch). In 2015 further additional responsibilities were assumed for the Royal Naval Reserve and the title of  Flag Officer, Maritime Reserves.

In this capacity the incumbent is responsible for advising the First Sea Lord and Chief of Naval Staff on all matters relating to Flag Officers’ appointing, with Officers with the rank of Commodore and/or Captain delegated to the Office of Assistant to the Naval Secretary who currently holds the rank of Commodore. A March 2020 edition of Navy News noted that the Director People and Training took over the people-related policies and career management below this level from the Naval Secretary.

In May 2021, it was announced that Jude Terry would be the next Naval Secretary, being promoted to rear admiral and taking up the post in 2022.  She is the first woman to serve as an admiral in the Royal Navy.

Secretaries
Post holders included:

Private Secretary to the First Lord of the Admiralty
 1800 – 1801 Captain John Harrison
 1801 – 1802 Captain Benjamin Tucker
 1802 – 1804 Captain George Parker	
 1804 – 1805 Captain William Budge 
 1805 – 1806  Captain John Deas Thomson
 1806 – 1807 Captain Henry Grant 
 1807 – 1808 Captain Edward Golding 
 1808 – 1809 Captain Robert Moorsom
 1809 – 1810 Captain Lord Edward O'Brien 
 1810 – 1812	Captain Frederick Edgcumbe 
 1812 – 1823 Captain Robert William Hay
 1823 – 1827 Captain George Baillie Hamilton 
 1827 – 1828 Captain Hon. Robert Cavendish Spencer 
 1828 – 1830 Captain Richard Saunders Dundas
 1830 – Captain John Thomas Briggs 
 1830 – 1831 Captain Edward Stewart 
 1831 – 1834 Major George Graham (RM) 
 1834 Captain George Gipps
 1834  – Captain John George Cole 
 1835  – Captain George Gipps
 1835  – Captain Hon. Frederick William Grey 
 1835  – 1839 Captain Henry Tufnell 
 1839  – 1841 Viscount Melgund (acting) 	 
 1841  – 1845 Captain William Baillie-Hamilton
 1845 – 1846 Captain Richard Saunders Dundas
 1846 – Captain Hon. Henry Spencer Law 
 1846 – 1848 Captain Henry Eden 
 1848 – 1852 Captain Charles Eden 
 1852 – 1853 Captain Frederick Thomas Pelham 
 1853 – 1855 Captain Henry Higgins Donatus O'Brien 
 1855 – 1857 Captain Thomas George Baring 
 1857 – 1858 Captain Hon. James Robert Drummond 
 1858 – 1859 Captain Herbert Harley Murray 
 1859 – 1862 Captain John Moore 
 1862 – 1863 Captain Alfred Phillips Ryder 
 1863 – 1866 Captain Robert Hall
 1866 – Captain Frederick Archibald Campbell
 1866 – 1867 Captain John Slaney Pakington 
 1867 – 1868 Captain Thomas Brandreth  
 1868 – 1870 Captain Frederick Beauchamp Paget Seymour 
 1870 – 1871 Captain Chandos S. Scudamore Stanhope
 1871 – 1873 Captain George Tryon  
 1874 – 1876 Captain Michael Culme-Seymour 
 1876 – 1881 Captain William Codrington  
 1881 – 1883 Captain John O. Hopkins  
 1883 – 1885 Captain Lewis A. Beaumont  
 1885 – 1888 Rear-Admiral The Rt. Hon. Lord Walter Kerr  
 1889 – 1892 Rear-Admiral Alfred T. Dale 
 1892 – 1894 Captain Richard H. Hamond 
 1894 – 1897 Captain Hedworth Lambton
 1897 – 1899 Captain Wilmot Fawkes
 1899 – 1900 Captain Maurice Bourke
 1900 – 1902 Captain Wilmot Fawkes
 1902 – 1905 Captain Hugh Tyrwhitt
 1905 – 1908 Captain Hugh Evan-Thomas
 1908 – 1910 Captain Charles Madden

Naval Secretaries to the First Lord of the Admiralty
Post holders included
 1911 – 1912 Rear-Admiral Ernest Troubridge
 1912 – 1913 Rear-Admiral David Beatty
 1913 – 1914 Rear-Admiral Dudley de Chair
 Aug – Oct 1914 Rear-Admiral Horace Hood
 Oct – Nov 1914 Rear-Admiral Henry Oliver
 1914 – 1916 Commodore Charles de Bartolomé
 1916 – 1918 Rear-Admiral Allan Everett
 1918 – 1921 Rear-Admiral Sir Rudolph Bentinck
 1921 – 1923 Rear-Admiral Hugh Watson
 1923 – 1925 Vice-Admiral Michael Hodges
 Apr 1925 Vice-Admiral Sir Hubert Brand
 1925 – 1927 Rear-Admiral Frank Larken
 1927 – 1929 Rear-Admiral Eric Fullerton
 1929 – 1932 Rear-Admiral George Chetwode
 1932 – 1934 Rear-Admiral Sidney Meyrick
 1934 – 1937 Rear-Admiral Guy Royle
 1937 – 1939 Rear-Admiral William Whitworth
 May – Nov 1939 Rear-Admiral Stuart Bonham Carter
 1939 – 1941 Rear-Admiral Edward Syfret
 1941 – 1942 Rear-Admiral Arthur Peters
 1942 – 1944 Rear-Admiral Frederick Dalrymple-Hamilton
 1944 – 1945 Rear-Admiral Cecil Harcourt
 1945 – 1946 Rear-Admiral Claud Barry
 1948 – 1948 Rear-Admiral Maurice Mansergh
 1948 – 1950 Rear-Admiral Peveril William-Powlett
 1950 – 1952 Rear-Admiral William Davis
 1952 – 1954 Rear-Admiral Richard Onslow
 1954 – 1956 Rear-Admiral David Luce
 1956 – 1958 Rear-Admiral Alastair Ewing
 1958 – 1960 Rear-Admiral John Hamilton
 1960 – 1962 Rear-Admiral Frank Twiss

Naval Secretaries
Post holders included 
 1962 – 1964 Rear-Admiral John Hayes
 1964 – 1966 Rear-Admiral William O'Brien
 Jan – Mar 1966 Rear-Admiral Anthony Griffin
 1966 – 1967 Rear-Admiral Gervaise Cooke
 1967 – 1970 Rear-Admiral David Dunbar-Nasmith
 1970 – 1972 Rear-Admiral Iwan Raikes
 1972 – 1974 Rear-Admiral Gordon Tait
 1974 – 1976 Rear-Admiral John Forbes
 1976 – 1978 Rear-Admiral Peter Buchanan
 1978 – 1980 Rear-Admiral Paul Greening
 1980 – 1983 Rear-Admiral Richard Fitch
 1983 – 1985 Rear-Admiral Richard Thomas
 1985 – 1987 Rear-Admiral Roger Dimmock
 1987 – 1988 Rear-Admiral Norman King
 1988 – 1990 Rear-Admiral David Dobson
 1990 – 1992 Rear-Admiral Christopher Morgan
 1992 – 1994 Rear-Admiral Malcolm Rutherford
 1994 – 1996 Rear-Admiral Alan West
 1996 – 1998 Rear-Admiral Fabian Malbon
 1998 – 2002 Rear-Admiral Jeremy de Halpert
 2002 – 2004 Rear-Admiral Mark Kerr
 2004 – 2005 Rear-Admiral Peter Wilkinson
 2005 – 2007 Rear-Admiral Richard Ibbotson
 2007 – 2010 Rear-Admiral Charles Montgomery
 2010 – 2012 Rear-Admiral David Steel
 2012 – 2015 Vice-Admiral Jonathan Woodcock
 2015 – 2018 Rear-Admiral Simon Williams, also Flag Officer Maritime Reserves
 2018 – 2020 Rear-Admiral Michael Bath
 2020 – 2022 Rear-Admiral Philip Hally
 2022 – present Rear-Admiral Jude Terry

References

Further reading
 'Private Secretary to First Lord and Lord High Admiral 1800–70', in Office-Holders in Modern Britain: Volume 4, Admiralty Officials 1660–1870, ed. J C Sainty (London, 1975), pp. 65–66. British History Online [accessed 29 January 2017].
 Hamilton, C. I. (2003). "Expanding Naval Powers: Admiralty Private Secretaries and Private Offices, 1800–1945". War in History 10 (2): pp. 125–156.
 Naval Staff, Training and Staff Duties Division (1929). The Naval Staff of the Admiralty. Its Work and Development. B.R. 1845 (late C.B. 3013). Copy at The National Archives. ADM 234/434.
 Sainty, J. C. (1975). Admiralty Officials, 1660–1870. London: The Athlone Press. .

 

Royal Navy appointments